Suspended particulate matter can refer to:

 Particulates, atmospheric aerosol particles
 Suspended solids, colloidal suspensions in water in general
 Total suspended solids, a water quality measurement of the mass of particles in water by dry weight